Lytle can refer to:

People
 Andrew Nelson Lytle (1902-1995), American writer
 Bob Lytle (1916–1998), American basketball player
 Chris Lytle, American martial arts fighter
 Donald Lytle (1938–2003), stage name of Johnny Paycheck, American singer-songwriter
 Jason Lytle, American musician
 Johnny Lytle, American boxer, musician
 Lutie Lytle, American lawyer
 Marshall Lytle, American musician
 Rob Lytle, American football player
 Robert Todd Lytle, American politician
 William Haines Lytle, American general, politician, and poet

Places
 Lytle, Texas
Noblit-Lytle House, historic house in Tennessee, USA

Geology
 Lytle Sandstone Formation, Colorado
 Lytle Limestone, member of Arroyo Formation, Texas